Apolipoprotein L6 is a protein that in humans is encoded by the APOL6 gene.

This gene is a member of the apolipoprotein L gene family. The encoded protein is found in the cytoplasm, where it may affect the movement of lipids or allow the binding of lipids to organelles.

References

External links

Further reading